Ismail Juma (3 August 1991 – 3 November 2017) was a Tanzanian long-distance runner.

Career
He competed in the 10,000 metres event at the 2015 World Championships in Athletics in Beijing, China, but did not finish.

Juma won the Kilimanjaro half marathon in 2015, and the Istanbul Half Marathon in 2017, setting a new record of 1:00:09. As of November 2017, holds the Tanzanian national half marathon record of 59min 30sec.

Death
Juma died in November 2017 after being involved in a motorcycle accident. At the time of his death, he had been selected as one of the athletes training for the Commonwealth Games in Australia.

See also
 Tanzania at the 2015 World Championships in Athletics

References

External links

1991 births
2017 deaths
Place of birth missing
Tanzanian male long-distance runners
World Athletics Championships athletes for Tanzania
20th-century Tanzanian people
21st-century Tanzanian people